The Watahomigi Formation is a geologic formation in the Grand Canyon region of Arizona.

It preserves fossils dating back to the Carboniferous period.

See also

 List of fossiliferous stratigraphic units in Arizona
 Paleontology in Arizona

References
 

Geologic formations of Arizona
Natural history of the Grand Canyon
Carboniferous Arizona
Carboniferous System of North America